Mattias Karlsson (born 6 February 1972) is a Swedish orienteering competitor. He is Relay World Champion from 2003, as a member of the Swedish winning team in the World Orienteering Championship in Rapperswil-Jona, Switzerland. He also has bronze medals from 2004 and 2006 (relay), and obtained silver in the 2004 Long distance World Championships in Västerås, Sweden. He is several times Swedish Champion, in 1998 (Long distance), in 1999 (Long distance), in 2002 (both Long distance and Night Orienteering), and in 2006 (Relay).

References

External links

1972 births
Living people
Swedish orienteers
Male orienteers
Foot orienteers
World Orienteering Championships medalists